The 2012 Desafio Litoral Rally was a first edition of rally raid endurance race held in Argentina from 23–28 July 2012. It was the first Dakar Series rally held in South America. The itinerary contained 3,454 kilometres of roads and tracks in total, including 1,840 of timed sections. It was organized by the Amaury Sport Organisation.

Itinerary

The race was held in public roads in the northeastern Argentine provinces of Misiones, Corrientes and Chaco. The original route included two stops at Asunción and Encarnación in Paraguay, but were cancelled prior to the event because of political instability after the impeachment of the president.

 23 July: Iguazú – Posadas 
 24 July: Posadas – Posadas
 25 July: Posadas – Bella Vista 
 26 July: Bella Vista – Corrientes
 27 July: Corrientes – Resistencia 
 28 July: Resistencia – Resistencia

Stage results

Bikes

Results

Bikes
 Cyril Despres (KTM) 13:56:54
 Jakub Przygoński (KTM) +4:45
 Mauricio Gomez (Yamaha) +1:03:15
 Pablo Rodríguez (Honda) +1:33:38
 Javier Pizzolito (Honda) +1:35:52

Cars
 Orlando Terranova/Paulo Fiuza (BMW) 12:48:06
 Nani Roma/Michel Périn (Mini) +26.39
 Boris Garafulic/Gilles Picard (BMW) +1:39:56
 Omar Gandara/Mauricio Jeromin (Toyota) +3:15:32
 Roberto Recalde/Carlos Zarza (Higher) +3:26:26

Quads 4x2
 Sergio Lafuente
 Gastón González
 Sebastián Foche
 Francisco Bartucci
 Germán Wolenberg

Quads 4x4
 Daniel Mazzucco
 Ezio Blangino
 Claudio Cavigliasso
 Pablo Ríos
 Pablo Bustamante

UTV
 Omar Yoma
 Alberto Depetris
 Pablo Depetris
 Hugo Zucchini
 Carlos González

References

External links
dakar.com (multilingual)

Desafio Litoral Rally
Desafio Litoral Rally
Desafio Litoral Rally
Rally raid races